Senator del Valle may refer to:

Miguel del Valle (born 1951), Illinois State Senate
Reginaldo Francisco del Valle (1854–1938), California State Senate